The UEFA Women's U-19 Championship 2003 Final Tournament was held in Germany between 25 July – 3 August 2003. Players born after 1 January 1984 were eligible to participate in this competition.

The tournament is notable for featuring a penalty kick shootout in the final group game in Group A between Italy and Sweden to determine the second semifinal qualifier.  This is the first time that a penalty-kick shootout has been used in the group stage of a tournament since the rule was introduced.

Qualifying

36 teams played for seven free places in the final. Two qualifying rounds were played.

Final tournament

Group A

Group B

Semifinals

Final

Awards

References

External links
Official website

 
UEFA Women's Under-19 Championship
Women
UEFA
International women's association football competitions hosted by Germany
UEFA Women's Under-19 Championship
UEFA Women's Under-19 Championship
UEFA Women's Under-19 Championship
UEFA Women's Under-19 Championship
UEFA Women's Under-19 Championship
UEFA Women's Under-19 Championship
UEFA Women's Under-19 Championship
UEFA Women's Under-19 Championship
UEFA Women's Under-19 Championship
UEFA Women's Under-19 Championship
UEFA Women's Under-19 Championship